AD 74 (LXXIV) was a common year starting on Saturday (link will display the full calendar) of the Julian calendar. At the time, it was known as the Year of the Consulship of Titus (third time) and Vespasian (fifth time) (or, less frequently, year 827 Ab urbe condita). The denomination AD 74 for this year has been used since the early medieval period, when the Anno Domini calendar era became the prevalent method in Europe for naming years.

Events

By place

Roman Empire 
 Emperor Vespasian and his son Titus Caesar Vespasianus become Roman Consuls.
 The Black Forest region is reattached to the Roman Empire.
 December 27 – Vespasian grants generous privileges to doctors and teachers.

Asia 
 The Chinese reestablish a protectorate of the Western Regions. 
 Chinese generals Dou Gu (Teou Kou) and Geng Bing (Keng Ping) take control of Turpan.

By topic

Arts and Science 
 Mesopotamia: The last known cuneiform text is written.

Births 
 March 18 – Hyginus, bishop of Rome

Deaths 
 Caenis, Roman slave and secretary of Antonia Minor (mother of Emperor Claudius) and mistress of Emperor Vespasian
 Polemon II, prince of the Bosporan Kingdom, Pontus, Cilicia and Cappadocia

References 

0074